Andrei Rădoi (born 7 February 1987) is a Romanian rugby union player. He plays in the hooker position for professional Liga Națională de Rugby club SCM Rugby Timișoara and București based European Challenge Cup side the Wolves. 

Rădoi also played for Romania's national team the Oaks. Between December 2013 Rădoi plays for Ealing Trailfinders, promoted in April 2015 to the English Championship (level 2).

References

External links

 Andrei Rădoi at Timișoara Saracens website

1987 births
Romanian rugby union players
Romania international rugby union players
București Wolves players
CSA Steaua București (rugby union) players 
SCM Rugby Timișoara players
Romanian expatriate sportspeople in England
Expatriate rugby union players in England
Rugby union hookers
Living people
Ealing Trailfinders Rugby Club players